Rinchenpong is one of the 32 assembly constituencies of Sikkim a north east state of India. Rinchenpong is part of Sikkim Lok Sabha constituency.

This constituency is reserved for members of the Bhutia-Lepcha community.

Members of Legislative Assembly

Election results

2019

See also

 Richenpong
 West Sikkim district
 List of constituencies of Sikkim Legislative Assembly

References

Assembly constituencies of Sikkim
Gyalshing district